Compassionate Sex is a 2000 Spanish-Mexican comedy film directed by Laura Mañá.

Cast
 Élisabeth Margoni - Lolita
 Álex Angulo - Pepe
 Pilar Bardem - Berta
 Juan Carlos Colombo - Padre Anselmo
 Carmen Salinas - La madame
 Mariola Fuentes - Floren
 Leticia Huijara - Leocadia
 Damián Alcázar - Hombre virgen

References

External links 

2000 comedy films
2000 films
Spanish comedy films
Mexican comedy films
2000s Mexican films
2000s Spanish films